Marco Borciani (born 7 December 1975 in Desenzano del Garda) is a retired Italian motorcycle racer,  
now motorcycle racing team owner and manager.

Career
Borciani started racing in the Italian Sport Production Championship, gaining eighth place in 1994, and fourth in 1995. He then moved to the Italian Honda GP 125 championship in 1996, while still continuing with rounds of the Sport Production series.

In 1997 he debuted in the European 125cc Championship, and took part in the final round of the 125 cc World Championship. Throughout the 1998 season he competed for the European 125 cc title against Marco Melandri, but after an accident and resultant damage to his hand, his season ended early with three rounds to complete.

In 1999 he raced in the World Supersport Championship, competing on a Honda CBR600F4, gaining a single point at the Nürburgring.

From 2000 to 2007, he competed in the Superbike World Championship:
2000: Team Pedercini, Ducati 996RS, 46th
2001: Team Pedercini, Ducati 996RS, 27th
2002: Team Pedercini, Ducati 998RS, 15th
2003: Team DFXtreme, Ducati 998RS, 10th
2004: Team DFXtreme/Sterilgarda, Ducati 998RS, 10th
2005: Team DFXtreme/Sterilgarda, Yamaha YZF-R1/Ducati 999RS, 27th
2006: Team Sterilgarda-Berik, Ducati 999 F05, 25th
2007: Team Sterilgarda, Ducati 999 F06, 20th

From the 2003 season, he also raced in part of the Italian-national CIV Superbike championship, coming tenth in both 2003 and 2004. He returned to CIV Superbike from the 2006 season, joining the works Ducati team for two seasons.

BRC Racing
In the 2005 season, Borciani had started his own BRC Racing team, managing other riders competing in series from junior Italian-based series, through WSBK and Superstock.

Having been released from the CIV Superbike Ducati-works team, he raced his own privateer Ducati in the 2008 series coming eighth, and the 2009 series, coming fourth.

2006: Team Sterilgarda-Berik, Borciani/Rubén Xaus, Ducati 999 F05
2007: Team Sterilgarda, Borciani/Xaus, Ducati 999 F06
2008: Team Sterilgarda, Xaus, Ducati 1098
2009: Team Sterilgarda, Shane Byrne, Ducati 1098

Due to the 2008 global financial crisis, for the 2010 season the team merged with Guandalini Racing to create PATA B&G Racing.

Career statistics

Grand Prix motorcycle racing

Races by year
(key) (Races in bold indicate pole position, races in italics indicate fastest lap)

Supersport World Championship

Races by year
(key) (Races in bold indicate pole position, races in italics indicate fastest lap)

Superbike World Championship

Races by year
(key) (Races in bold indicate pole position) (Races in italics indicate fastest lap)

References

External links
Personal website

1975 births
Living people
People from Desenzano del Garda
Italian motorcycle racers
Supersport World Championship riders
Superbike World Championship riders
Italian motorsport people
Italian businesspeople
Sportspeople from the Province of Brescia